Shimla Lok Sabha constituency (formerly, Simla Lok Sabha constituency) is one of the four Lok Sabha (parliamentary) constituencies in Himachal Pradesh state in northern India. The seat is reserved for the candidates belonging to the Scheduled Castes.

Assembly segments
Shimla Lok Sabha constituency presently comprises the following 17 Vidhan Sabha (legislative assembly) segments:

Members of Parliament

^ by poll

Election Results

2019

2014

2009

2004

See also
 Shimla district
 List of Constituencies of the Lok Sabha

References

Lok Sabha constituencies in Himachal Pradesh
Shimla district
Solan district
Sirmaur district